Diadexia anchylocrossa is a moth in the family Crambidae. It was described by Turner in 1924. It is found in Australia.

References

Crambinae
Moths described in 1924